The 1952 United States Senate election in Ohio was held on November 4, 1952. 

Incumbent Republican Senator John W. Bricker was re-elected to a second term in office over Director of the Economic Stabilization Agency and former Toledo mayor Michael DiSalle.

Republican primary

Candidates
John W. Bricker, incumbent Senator since 1947

Results

Democratic primary

Candidates
James M. Carney, Cleveland millionaire
Michael DiSalle, Director of the Economic Stabilization Agency and former Mayor of Toledo (1948–50)
John W. Donahey, former loan examiner for the Reconstruction Finance Corporation
George L. Mark, candidate for U.S. House in 1946

Results

General election

Results

See also 
 1952 United States Senate elections

References 

1952
Ohio
United States Senate